You're the Best is the second studio album by American singer Keni Burke. It was released in 1981 on RCA Records.

Track listing
 "Let Somebody Love You"  (Keni Burke)   5:07
 "Gotta Find My Way Back in Your Heart"  (Keni Burke, Bill Withers) 6:16
 "Love Is the Answer" (Todd Rundgren)     5:35
 "You're the Best"  (Dean Gant, Dennis Burke, Keni Burke, Leon "Ndugu" Chancler)       4:15
 "Paintings of Love"  (Keni Burke) 2:42
 "Night Riders" (Dennis Burke, George Johnson, Keni Burke) 5:08
 "Never Stop Loving Me" (Keni Burke, Curtis Mayfield) 5:17

Personnel
Keni Burke – vocals, bass, guitar (tracks: 1, 2, 4–7), background vocals
Dennis Burke (tracks: 1–3, 5–7), Michael Thompson (tracks: 3, 4) – guitar
Dean Gant – piano (tracks: 1, 5, 6), keyboards 
Reginald "Sonny" Burke (tracks: 1, 6) – piano
Leon "Ndugu" Chancler – drums
Day Askey Burke, Terri Askey (tracks: 1, 5, 6) – background vocals
Gil Askey (tracks: 1, 7), Wade Marcus (tracks: 2) – string and horn arrangements
Edward "Chappie" Johnson – Executive Producer

References

1981 albums
Keni Burke albums
Albums arranged by Wade Marcus
RCA Records albums
Albums recorded at Total Experience Recording Studios